Australian Vintage Limited (AVG) is an Australian public company that operates within the wine production industry. It was established by Brian McGuigan with the help of his wife, Fay, and younger brother, Neil McGuigan. The company was incorporated on 30 May 1991 in New South Wales under the name Roserim Limited. This name later changed to Brian McGuigan Wines Limited. After the merger with Simeon Wines in 2002, the company changed its name to McGuigan Simeon Wines Limited, before renaming it to Australian Vintage Limited in 2008. Its main business activities include retail and wholesale wine production, and vineyard management services.

History

Early History 
The passion for winemaking is cultivated early in the McGuigan family. In 1880, Owen McGuigan— Brian and Neil's grandfather— started tending his vineyard located in Rothbury in the Hunter Region of New South Wales to make additional income aside from his dairy production business. His son, Percival (Perc) McGuigan, was influenced to pursue a career in the wine industry from helping his father in the vineyard. Starting in 1941, he became a vineyard manager for the Dalwood Estate for almost 30 years, which he later bought and renamed into Wyndham Estate. He was inducted as a Hunter Valley Legend in 2007 for being a key figure in the development of the Hunter Valley wine industry and community, in particular the shift of consumer preference from richer wines, to lighter dry table wines in the 1950s. This can be attributed to the increased opportunity of a full-range wine-tasting and the increase of European migrants knowledgeable of light wines.

Following Perc's purchase of the Wyndham Estate, his son—Brian— founded the Wyndham Estate Wine Company in the 1970s and became the company's Managing Director. In 1991, the company was sold, giving Brian the resources to build his own. His company was officially listed in the Australian Stock Exchange (ASX) on 26 March 1992 and incorporated as Roserim Limited, before changing its name to Brian McGuigan Wines Limited. Following his father's footsteps, Brian was inducted as a Hunter Valley Legend in 2008 for his contributions.

1992 - 2007 
Following its incorporation, Brian McGuigan Wines Ltd engaged in many acquisitions in its early business years. The company acquired the Bethany Creek and Vine Vale vineyards in 1992. In 1994, the company absorbed four wineries: Richmond Grove winery, Deaseys Road vineyard, Hunter Ridge winery and Pokolbin winery. In 1996, the company acquired an unlabeled vineyard in the Upper Hunter region. Between 1997 and 1998, it sold the Hunter Ridge label to BRL Hardy, acquired Hermitage Road winery and sold five of its vineyards to the Beston Pacific Vineyard Trust. In 1999, the company acquired an additional 25% of its UK distribution company, Geoffrey Roberts Agencies, as well as the Yaldara winery in the Barossa Valley region.

Brian McGuigan Wines Limited merged with Simeon Wines in 2002 and renamed the company to McGuigan Simeon Wines Limited on 10 July 2002. In 2003, it sold Richmond Grove Pathaway, Lawsons Pathaway and Qualco East Vineyards and acquired Miranda Wines. In 2005, it acquired Whitton vineyard, and divested of its Griffith-based winery and bottling operations to Dal Broi Family Wines Pty Ltd. It partnered with WaverlyTBS, a UK-based wine distributor, in 2006 to achieve one of its key company strategies, i.e. to grow its exports. Similarly, in 2007, the company partnered with a Dutch wine distributor, Group LFE. That same year it acquired Nepenthe Wines.

2008 - Now 
In 2008, by Board consensus, the company's name was changed to Australian Vintage Limited and was publicly listed on the Australian Stock Exchange under the code AVG. In 2011, it sold its Loxton Winery for AUD$27m to TWG Australia, a subsidiary of The Wine Group LLC, USA. In 2014, the company sold its Yaldara Winery to 1847 Winery (SA) Pty Ltd for AUD$15.5m to reduce its debt.

Brands
Australian Vintage Limited owns and manufactures the five brands listed below.

Key Personnel 
This section highlights some of the company key figures.

Neil McGuigan is the younger brother of founder, Brian McGuigan. Equipped with a degree in Oenology, Neil McGuigan served as the Chief Winemaker for McGuigan Wines— the company's flagship brand. His wine formulations won the brand numerous accolades, the most notable ones being the title of International Winemaker of the Year, which is won four times— in 2009, 2011, 2012 and 2016— at the International Wine & Spirits Competition (IWSC) held in November every year in London, thus becoming the first and only brand to do so. Additionally, due to his extensive contribution and reputation in the winemaking community, Neil McGuigan was appointed President of the IWSC in 2015. The strong ties to top wine distributors, sommeliers and other wine experts enabled an increase in brand exposure, and subsequently, global recognition for AVL, cementing Neil's role as key figure of the development of AVL. Besides his wine creations, Neil was appointed CEO on 21 July 2010 and maintained his position until recently, when he retired on 20 November 2019. Nonetheless, he remains involved by assuming the role of Global Wine Advisor for McGuigan Wines.

After Neil's retirement, Craig Gavin was chosen as the new CEO due to his substantial experience the fast-moving consumer goods (FMCG) sector obtained from having filled senior leadership positions in various companies, including Lion Nathan, Campbell Arnott's and Parmalat. His education includes an MBA from Harvard Business School.

The company's Chairman is Richard Davis, who has been director in the company since 5 May 2009 and was appointed the Non-Executive Chairman position on 1 June 2015. He is concurrently the Chairman of Monash IVF Group Limited, and a Non-executive director of InvoCare Limited. His experience includes being a partner at a national accounting firm and the CEO of InvoCare Limited.

The Chief Financial Officer (CFO) of AVL is Michael Noack. He was previously the Chief Financial Officer of Simeon Wines Limited and has maintained this position since the merger of the two companies in 2002. He holds a Bachelor of Accountancy and a Graduate Diploma in Systems Analysis from the University of South Australia, and is a fellow of the Australian Society of Certified Public Accountants (ASCPA) and the Chartered Secretaries Australia (now known as Governance Institute of Australia). He became the Company Secretary on 23 November 2005 and resigned on 1 July 2020. Following his resignation, Alicia Morris (Kinley) is appointed as Company Secretary. Morris joined AVL in 2010 and served as General Counsel previously. Her education includes a Bachelor of Laws and Legal Practice (Hons), Bachelor of Behavioral Science (Psychology), a Graduate Diploma of Applied Corporate Governance and is a fellow of the Governance Institute of Australia.

Operations 
The company generates 97% of its revenue from wine processing and packaging, 2% from the management of vineyards, and the remaining 1% from unallocated sources. Its operations span primarily across four continents: Europe— with an emphasis on the UK and Ireland, Australia, Asia and North America. The UK/Europe region is the leading export markets, generating 44.9% of the company's total revenue, with Australia coming next at 39%, then Asia and North America at 7.4% and 6% respectively. The geographic source of the remainder is undetermined.

Sustainability 

Australian Vintage is one of the pioneering companies undertaking major sustainability efforts in the Australian wine industry. In November 2018, the company signed the Hybrid Renewable Corporate Power Purchase Agreement (PPA). The agreement requires 90% of the energy consumption of the company's Buronga Hill plant located in New South Wales to be sourced from renewable energy sources. The plant is the third largest winery in Australia and the company determines that 60% of the energy is to be sourced from off-site wind and solar plants provided by Flow Power, a wholesale electricity supplier, while the remaining 30% is to be obtained from its privately owned on-site solar panel systems.

Expansion into China 
Australian Vintage Limited has made major investments as their "commitment to the Chinese market [grows] stronger than ever". In August 2014, it entered a long-term partnership with COFCO Wine & Spirits Co Ltd., which is a subsidiary of China Oil and Food Corporation (COFCO), a Chinese food manufacturing giant. This agreement grants COFCO exclusive distribution rights which is solely applicable to the McGuigan Wines brand.

For the remaining brands, i.e. Tempus Two, Nepenthe and the Barossa Valley Wine Company, the distribution rights are given to partner Vintage China Fund, led by Jiang Yuan, the founder of YesMyWine, China's largest online wine retailer. The partnership was signed in 2017 and involved Vintage China Fund raising AUD$16.5m capital by purchasing 35.9 million of AVL's shares. In addition, Yuan gained a controlling interest and became a member of the Board. The investment decision was made due to several reasons. Firstly, due to the partners’ notable experience in e-commerce— in particular, online wine trading. Secondly, due to a substantial rise in Australian wine sales in 2016, driven mostly by the success of rival Australian wine company, Treasury Wine Estates, owner of the brands Penfolds, Wolf Blass and more.

References

External links 
 Company website
 McGuigan Wines
 Nepenthe
 Tempus Two
 The Barossa Valley Wine Company

Wineries of Australia
Australian wine
Multinational companies headquartered in Australia
Wineries in South Australia
Australian companies established in 1991
Food and drink companies established in 1991